Robert Fitzpatrick or FitzPatrick may refer to:

 Robert Fitzpatrick (lawyer) (1937–2010), American actor, lawyer, film producer, and music executive
 Robert Fitzpatrick (bishop), American bishop of the Episcopal Church
 Robert Fitzpatrick (art executive) (born 1940), Irish American art academic and executive
 Robert L. FitzPatrick, author